New Valley LLC is an American investment company owned by Vector Group.

History
Western Union was renamed New Valley in the early 1990s as the corporate parent of all Western Union-related businesses. In 1994, New Valley sold its Western Union businesses to First Financial Management (later acquired by First Data) for $1.2 Billion.

After more than 100 years of being a publicly traded entity, New Valley became a wholly owned subsidiary of Vector Group on December 13, 2005 when Vector Group acquired the remaining 42.3% of New Valley's common shares that it did not already own. New Valley presently has a 70% stake in Douglas Elliman, the largest residential real estate brokerage in the New York metropolitan area. The company also has stakes in various hotels and golf courses in the United States. In conjunction with the spin-off of its Ladenburg Thalmann subsidiary New Valley retained a 7.6% stake in Ladenburg Thalmann Financial Services, an investment bank and stock brokerage based in Miami.

References

External links

American companies established in 1986
Financial services companies established in 1986
Investment companies of the United States
Companies based in Miami
Western Union
2005 mergers and acquisitions